Chris Wheeler (26 July 1914 – 13 November 1984) was an Australian cyclist. He competed in the individual road race event at the 1936 Summer Olympics.

References

External links
 

1914 births
1984 deaths
Australian male cyclists
Olympic cyclists of Australia
Cyclists at the 1936 Summer Olympics
Cyclists from Victoria (Australia)